Rajapur is a village in Mohammadabad Tehsil in Ghazipur District of Uttar Pradesh State, India. It belongs to Varanasi Division. It is located 28 km towards east from District headquarters Ghazipur. Rajapur has total 835 families residing. The Rajapur village has population of 4872 of which 2487 are males while 2385 are females as per Population Census 2011.

History
Rajapur was established by Shrikant Rai Vats around 1715 A.D. with the blessing of Goril Baba as per genealogical records. He moved from Raini-Amari village of Azamgarh district to this place. This village is considered one of the Baavano Dronvar villages.
Rajapur is known for farmers, army men, Pahlwan, doctors, famous engineers and also known for freedom fighters.

Administration
This village is administrated by Gram Panchayat through its Pradhan who is elected representative of village. Ashwani kumar rai is the Pradhan of this village panchayat.

Nearby places
 Varanasi
 [[Ghazipur
saraygandhu
 Buxar
 Mohammadabad
 Karimuddinpur
 Joga Musahib
 Khardiha
 Sherpur, Ghazipur

References

External links
 Villages in Ghazipur  Uttar Pradesh

Villages in Ghazipur district